Lagos (Greek: Λαγός) is a village in the northeastern part of the Evros regional unit in Greece. It is located south of Orestiada and north of Didymoteicho.  Lagos is part of the community of Ellinochori within the municipality of Didymoteicho.  In 2011 its population was 620. A military base next to Lagos is home to the Greek Army's 30th Mechanized Infantry Brigade.

See also

List of settlements in the Evros regional unit

References

Populated places in Evros (regional unit)